Bad Luck Streak in Dancing School is the fourth studio album by American singer-songwriter Warren Zevon. The album was released on February 15, 1980, by Elektra Records. Three singles were released from the album, one of which charted: "A Certain Girl" (a cover of a song previously recorded by Ernie K-Doe and The Yardbirds) reached  57 on the Billboard Hot 100 and was Zevon's second and final hit on that chart.

"Play It All Night Long" is a bracing take on the presumed bleak realities of white southern rural poverty, or "country living".

The term "dancing school" has been used as a euphemism for a brothel since the mid-17th century.

The album was dedicated to Ken Millar (1915–1983), popularly known as mystery writer Ross Macdonald, who had assisted Zevon in fighting through substance abuse addiction and successfully completing related treatment.

Record World said of the single "Gorilla, You're a Desperado" that "Zevon paints a picturesque fantasy of LA upper middle class absurdity."

Track listing
All songs written by Warren Zevon, unless otherwise indicated.

Personnel 
Warren Zevon – organ, synthesizer, bass guitar, guitar, harmonica, piano, strings, keyboards, vocals
Jorge Calderón – guitar on "A Certain Girl"; backing vocals on "Jungle Work"
David Lindley – lap steel on "Bad Luck Streak in Dancing School" and "Play It All Night Long"; guitar on "Wild Age"
Rick Marotta – percussion, drums, vocals, bells, Syndrums

 Additional personnel
The Sid Sharp Strings – strings
Jackson Browne – guitar, slide guitar on "Gorilla, You're a Desperado"; backing vocals on "A Certain Girl", "Play It All Night Long" and "Gorilla, You're a Desperado"
Don Felder – guitar on "A Certain Girl"
Glenn Frey – harmony vocals on "Bill Lee" and "Wild Age"
Don Henley – harmony vocals on "Wild Age" and "Gorilla, You're a Desperado"
Ben Keith – pedal steel guitar on "Bed of Coals"
Linda Ronstadt – descant on "Empty-Handed Heart"; backing vocals on "Bed of Coals"
Leland Sklar – bass guitar
J.D. Souther – backing vocals on "Gorilla, You're a Desperado" and "Bed of Coals"
Waddy Wachtel – lead guitar on "A Certain Girl"; guitar on "Empty-Handed Heart"
Joe Walsh – lead guitar on "Jungle Work" and "Jeannie Needs a Shooter"
Technical
Ernie Sheesley, Niko Bolas, Serge Reyes – engineers
Jimmy Wachtel – cover
George Gruel, Jimmy Wachtel, Michael Curtis – photography

Charts

See also
Letter to You, a 2020 Bruce Springsteen album, features a different song with a similar title, "Janey Needs a Shooter"

References

Warren Zevon albums
1980 albums
Albums produced by Greg Ladanyi
Elektra Records albums